Lucylena Martínez Rodríguez (born 28 May 1991) is a Cuban footballer who plays as a goalkeeper. She has been a member of the Cuba women's national team.

International career
Martínez capped for Cuba at senior level during the 2010 CONCACAF Women's World Cup Qualifying qualification, the 2012 CONCACAF Women's Olympic Qualifying Tournament (and its qualification) and the 2018 CONCACAF Women's Championship (and its qualification).

References

1991 births
Living people
Cuban women's footballers
Cuba women's international footballers
Women's association football goalkeepers
21st-century Cuban women